Prataprao Gurjar (–24 February 1674) was the Senapati of Chatrapati Shivaji Maharaj's army, and was an aristocratic general. He defeated a large Mughal Army at the Battle of Salher, a victory which was seen as a definitive turning point in the Maratha' military process against the Mughals.

A few months before Chatrapati Shivaji's coronation in 1674, Prataprao Gujar was tasked with defeating an invading force led by the Adilshahi General, Bahalol Khan. The Maratha Army surrounded the camp of Bahalol Khan at the village of Nesari and succeeded in defeating and capturing Bahalol Khan in the battle. Despite Chhatrapati Shivaji Maharaj's warnings, Prataprao later released Bahalol Khan, his troops, and his weapons in exchange for Bahalol Khan's promise not to invade Maratha territories again. 

Only days after Bahalol Khan release, Bahalol Khan began preparing to invade Maratha. When Chhatrapati Shivaji Maharaj heard of Prataprao's decision, he wrote a letter to Prataprao, refusing permission to see him until Bahlol Khan was re-captured. 

On 24 February 1674, Prataprao learned that Bahlol Khan was camping nearby. He decided to take a stand against Balol Khan at Nesari. Prataprao Gujar with 1,200 troops was against Khan with 15,000. 

Prataprao reasoned that there would be no point in taking his men with him, as it would likely end in a loss. He left alone without asking his cavalry to charge. Seeing their leader head to certain death, six other Maratha sardars joined him in the charge. They attacked the enemy camp and were slaughtered by the Mughal Army. Anandrao and Hansaji Mohite stayed back. It was an impulsive decision, and the loss of Prataprao Gujar was a significant loss to the Marathas. Anandrao Mohite managed to take the Maratha Army to safer areas.

The Maratha Army avenged the death of their general by defeating Bahlol Khan, and looting his jagir (fiefdom) under the leadership of Anandrao and Hambirrao Mohite. Hambirrao Mohite became the new Sarnaubat (Commander-in-chief of the Maratha forces).

Chhatrapati Shivaji Maharaj was deeply grieved and saddened on hearing of Prataprao Gujar's death at the hands of the Mughals.

References

Further reading
Read about Prataprao Gujar

Indian military leaders
Marathi people
People from Maharashtra
1615 births
1674 deaths
Warriors of the Maratha Empire